Little Pitt Cottage is a medieval house in Llanarth, Monmouthshire, South Wales. It was designated a Grade II* listed building in 1956, its listing record describing it as a "fine and exceptionally intact timber-framed house".

History and description
The house has a cruck trussed gable, with an exposed timber frame and four monumental centred doorways, modified to form a three-unit plan in the 17th century. The architectural historian John Newman describes the cottage as "the most completely surviving cruck-truss hall house in the county". The windows have timber lintels under a painted stone dripmould. The ends of beams for the inserted hall floor are visible. Sir Cyril Fox and Lord Raglan, in the first of their three-volume history of vernacular architecture Monmouthshire Houses, give a detailed description of the cottage, with plans and illustrations. Peter Smith, in his work, Houses of the Welsh Countryside, describes Little Pitt as "a good example" of the hall house plan.

The house was, and remains, part of the Llanarth estate and is Grade II* listed.

References

Sources
 
 
 

Grade II* listed buildings in Monmouthshire
Grade II* listed houses